The Hirth HM 60 was a four-cylinder inverted air-cooled inline aircraft engine designed in 1923 and first sold in 1924.  The engine was of very high quality, and its sales success contributed to Hirth's rapid pre-war expansion.  It was a popular engine for light aircraft delivering 80 hp (60 kW) at 2,300 rpm.  Later Hirth engines built upon the HM 60's success and provided greater power with many of the same design features.

Variants
HM60
HM60R
HM60R-2

Applications
Fieseler Fi 5
Göppingen Gö 9
Horten H.V
Klemm Kl 25
Klemm Kl 35
Klemm Kl 107
Shackleton-Murray SM.1
WNF Wn 16

Specifications (HM 60R)

See also

References

External links

 Oldengine.org

Hirth aircraft engines
1920s aircraft piston engines